Denzel Spencer (born April 18, 1996), better known by his stage name Roy Woods (also stylized as Roy Wood$), is a Canadian singer and rapper. Woods is signed to OVO Sound, the record label co-founded by Canadian rapper and singer Drake, record producer Noah "40" Shebib and Oliver El-Khatib. Woods is also the founder of his own collective, Unlock The Underground.

Early life
Denzel Spencer was born April 18, 1996, in Brampton, Ontario, Canada. For over three years, Woods attended Turner Fenton High School and eventually made a decision to move to St. Augustine Secondary School during his final year. Before his music career took off, he was often recognized for his commitment and talent in the sport of football. The origin of his name "Roy" comes from a youth that lived in the same building as him from Brampton. Woods took a survey throughout his high school and "Roy Wood$" seemed to be the winning ticket.

Career

2014–present: Career beginnings and Say Less
On July 11, 2015, Drake premiered "Drama", the first song from Woods' EP, Exis. The song was also premiered on Apple's Beats 1 radio during the first OVO Sound radio show. The track also features with the guest appearances from Woods' label boss, Drake. On July 25, 2015, a second song titled "Get You Good" premiered on the second episode of the OVO Sound radio show. On July 31, 2015, Roy released his debut EP Exis digitally through OVO Sound, of which was the record label co-founded by Canadian rapper and singer Drake. On October 9, 2015, Woods released his first music video for his song, "Jealousy". It has since garnered over 9,000,000 views on YouTube.

On July 1, 2016, Wood's first mixtape, Waking at Dawn, was released and promoted by Woods and other artists, including Drake and Wiz Khalifa through social media.

On December 23, 2016, Woods released his second EP, titled Nocturnal.

On July 20, 2017, Woods released the track, "What Are You On?", as the lead single from his debut album, Say Less. On November 17, 2017, Woods released the title track, "Say Less". On December 1, 2017, Woods released his debut studio album, Say Less.

On June 8, 2018, Woods released two new singles, titled "Russian Cream" and "Snow White", with no prior announcement.

On February 8, 2019, Roy Woods released a single titled "Worth It".

On September 18, 2019, Roy Woods released a single titled "Bubbly".

On May 8, 2020, Roy Woods released his newest single titled "I Feel It"

On May 15, 2020, Roy Woods released his third EP, titled Dem Times.

In 2023, he participated in an all-star recording of Serena Ryder's single "What I Wouldn't Do", which was released as a charity single to benefit Kids Help Phone's Feel Out Loud campaign for youth mental health.

Artistry
Woods has said some of his biggest influences are Michael Jackson, Drake, Nelly, The Weeknd and PartyNextDoor. Woods has also started an artist collective, titled Unlock The Underground, which is a branch of the OVO Sound. The artists on this collective include In-house Producer/Engineer BATMANONTHEBEATZ, RAYNY, and DOLOINDACUT as Wood's Official DJ.

Discography

Studio albums

Mixtapes

Extended plays

Singles

Other charted and certified songs

Music videos

Tours
Headlining
 Unlocked Tour (2016)
 Say Less Tour (2018)

Supporting
 Summer Sixteen Tour  (2016)
Aubrey and the Three Migos Tour  (2018)

Filmography

References

External links
 
 

1996 births
Living people
Black Canadian musicians
Musicians from Toronto
OVO Sound artists
People from Brampton
Warner Records artists